The Zamboanga City Council (Chavacano: Consejo de la Ciudad de Zamboanga) is Zamboanga City's Sangguniang Panlungsod or local legislature.

Currently composed of 19 members, with 16 councilors elected from Zamboanga City's two legislative districts and three (3) ex-officio members composed of the: (1) President of the Liga ng mga Barangay ng Lungsod ng Zamboanga (English: League of Barangays of the City of Zamboanga); (2) the President of the Pederasyon ng Sangguniang Kabataan (English: Federation of Youth Councils); and (3) the Mandatory Representative of the indigenous peoples in Zamboanga City.

The presiding officer of the council is the Vice-Mayor, who is elected citywide.

The council is responsible for creating laws and ordinances under Zamboanga City's jurisdiction. The mayor can veto proposed bills, but the council can override it with a two-thirds supermajority.

Evolution
The first legislative body of Zamboanga was established in 1914 composed of councilors who represented the different districts of barrios of then-municipality of Zamboanga. When the City Charter of Zamboanga was signed on October 12, 1936, the municipal council was replaced by the City Council presided by the mayor and consisted of five councilors, the city treasurer and the city engineer. All members are appointed by the President of the Philippine Commonwealth.

With the passage of Republic Act No. 1210 on April 29, 1955, the position of mayor became elective and the post of vice-mayor was created. The Council also became elective and its membership was increased to eight presided by the vice-mayor.

During the Marcos regime, the city council was renamed to Sangguniang Panglungsod and its membership shuffled. The mayor became the presiding-officer while the vice-mayor became a regular member. Other representatives such as the agriculture, business and labor sectoral representatives; chairman of the Kabataan Barangay Federation and the president of the Association of Barangay Captains was added to the council. All members of the council except for the mayor and the vice-mayor are all appointed by the President.

After Marcos was deposed, a new Local Government Code was enacted in 1991 and the mayor was restored to the executive branch. The city council organization existed since.

The composition of the Council changed when the representation of the youth was left unfilled during the 2013 Sangguniang Kabataan elections by virtue of Republic Act No. 10362, postponing the SK elections from 2013 to 2015 to pave way for reforms in the considered corrupt agency in the government. In 2013, the youth sector in the city has no representative to the Council effectively decreasing its membership from 18 to 17. The youth representation will be filled again in the upcoming 2016 elections.

On 2014, the membership of the Council increased again by 1 as an assembly of the indigenous peoples in the city chose a representative to represent their interests in the Council.

On 2018, the SK representation has been filled as the Philippines has conducted Barangay and SK elections since its second postponement in 2017.

Manner of election
Each of Zamboanga City's two legislative districts elects eight councilors to the council. In plurality-at-large voting, a voter may vote up to eight candidates, with the candidates having the eight highest number of votes being elected.

In addition, the Barangay chairmen and the SK chairmen throughout the city elect amongst themselves their representatives to the council. 
The representative of the indigenous peoples (IPs) in the city is elected by bonafide members of the IP Council of Elders who will serve with the same functions of a city councilor. Hence, there are 19 councilors.

City council elections are synchronized with other elections in the country. Elections are held every first Monday of May every third year since 1992.

Membership
As the presiding officer, the vice-mayor can only vote to break ties.

The list below comprises the members of the council:

Current Membership of the Council (2019–2022)

Notes
 The President of the Liga ng mga Barangay in Zamboanga City is an ex-officio member of the Sangguniang Panglungsod.
 The President of the Pedersayon ng mga Sangguniang Kabataan in Zamboanga City is an ex-officio member of the Sangguniang Panglungsod.
 The Mandatory Representative of the Indigenous Peoples in Zamboanga City is an ex-officio member of the Sangguniang Panglungsod.
 Former San Roque Barangay chairman Joselito Macrohon was appointed by President Rodrigo Duterte to fill in the vacancy of Councilor Mariano. Macrohon run for councilor last 2016 but lost.
 Former councilor Rogelio Valesco, Jr. was appointed by President Duterte to fill in the remaining months of Valderrosa-Abubakar's term.

Membership of the Council (2016–2019)

Notes
 The President of the Liga ng mga Barangay in Zamboanga City is an ex-officio member of the Sangguniang Panglungsod.
 The President of the Pedersayon ng mga Sangguniang Kabataan in Zamboanga City is an ex-officio member of the Sangguniang Panglungsod.
 The Mandatory Representative of the Indigenous Peoples in Zamboanga City is an ex-officio member of the Sangguniang Panglungsod.
 Councilor Mariano was disqualified by COMELEC as he was found guilty by the Supreme Court for violation of Batas Pambansa Blg. 22 or the Bouncing Cheque Law prior to the 2016 elections making his seat vacant.
 Former San Roque Barangay chairman Joselito Macrohon was appointed by President Rodrigo Duterte to fill in the vacancy of Councilor Mariano. Macrohon run for councilor last 2016 but lost.
 Myra Paz Valderrosa-Abubakar was appointed by President Rodrigo Duterte to be regional director of Region IX Department of Tourism on July 30, 2018, vacating her seat.
 Former councilor Rogelio Valesco, Jr. was appointed by President Duterte to fill in the remaining months of Valderrosa-Abubakar's term.

Membership of the Council (2013–2016)

Powers, duties and functions
The Sangguniang Panlungsod, as the legislative body of the city, is mandated by the Local Government Code of 1991 to[1]:

Enact ordinances;
Approve resolutions;
Appropriate funds for the general welfare of the city and its inhabitants; and
Ensure the proper exercise of the corporate powers of the city as provided for under Section 22 of the Local Government Code.

Furthermore, the following duties and functions are relegated to the Sangguniang Panlungsod:

Approve ordinances and pass resolutions necessary for an efficient and effective city government;
Generate and maximize the use of resources and revenues for the development plans, program objectives and priorities of the city as provided for under section 18 of the Local Government Code of 1991, with particular attention to agro-industrial development and citywide growth and progress;
Enact ordinances granting franchises and authorizing the issuance of permits or licenses, upon such conditions and for such purposes intended to promote the general welfare of the inhabitants of the city but subject to the provisions of Book II of the Local Government Code of 1991;
Regulate activities relative to the use of land, buildings, and structures within the city in order to promote the general welfare of its inhabitants;
Approve ordinances which shall ensure the efficient and effective delivery of the basic services and facilities as provided for under Section 17 of the Local Government Code; and
Exercise such other powers and perform such other duties and functions as may be prescribed by law or ordinance.

Standing committees

2016–2019
There are 32 standing committees in the city council each headed by a city councilor.

2013–2016
There are 32 standing committees in the city council each headed by a city councilor.

References

City councils in the Philippines
Local government in Zamboanga City